The 1964 Philadelphia Eagles season was the franchise's 32nd season in the National Football League.

Offseason
Joe Kuharich is hired as Head Coach after he leaves Notre Dame. He is still their only head coach with a lifetime losing record while coaching there, going 17–23 in 4 years. Owner Jerry Wolman give Kuharich an unheard of contract of $1 million over 15 years. He then trades future Hall of Famers Sonny Jurgensen to the Washington Redskins  and Tommy McDonald to the Dallas Cowboys.

Earl Gros and Pro Bowler and Hall of Fame member Jim Ringo are acquired reportedly when he tried to have an agent talk for him during Ringo's 1964 contract talks with Green Bay.  The Eagles send Lee Roy Caffey and their 1965 1st round draft pick to the Packers.

NFL Draft
The 1964 NFL Draft and the 1964 AFL Draft were 2 different draft held by the respected leagues. The NFL Draft was held on December 2, 1963, and the AFL Draft was held on November 30, 1963.

Where the NFL teams could draft any eligible player coming out of college, the AFL had territorial picks in the early rounds. These were players that lived in a certain area or went to college there. This could be why the Eagles 2nd round pick (16th pick), was the AFL's 1st pick in the draft. Some players made arrangements with the AFL leaders that they would sign for a set if a certain team drafted them, this was relayed to the AFL teams. Some of these players signed contracts as soon as their last college game was over on the field or in the parking lot.

The NFL Draft was for 20 rounds with 14 teams picking. The Eagles had the second pick in those rounds. They ended up picking 18 players.

The overall pick in the draft was Dave Parks, an End out of Texas Tech. The Eagle choose future Hall of Fame member Bob Brown, an offensive tackle out of Nebraska. There were 10 Hall of Fame members taken in this draft, 4 of them in the first round. The Dallas Cowboys get 2 of them when they take a chance on Bob Hayes in the 7th round and Roger Staubach in the 10th round.  Roger Staubach had to serve a 4-year military obligation in the US Navy before he could play NFL football because he attended the United States Naval Academy.

Regular season

Schedule

Season summary

Week 3: vs. Cleveland Browns

Week 12: at Cleveland Browns

Standings

Roster

Awards and honors
Pro Bowl Players
Sam Baker (P)
Maxie Baughan (LB)
Irv Cross (DB)
Floyd Peters (DT)
Pete Retzlaff (TE)
Jim Ringo (C)

References

 Eagles on Pro Football Reference
 Eagles on jt-sw.com
 Eagles on Eagles.net

Philadelphia Eagles seasons
Philadelphia Eagles
Philadel